The Real Housewives of Toronto (abbreviated RHOT) was a Canadian reality television series that premiered on March 7, 2017 on Slice. Developed as the second Canadian installment of The Real Housewives franchise. The series aired for one season and followed the personal and professional lives of several women living in Toronto, Canada.

The series consisted of 10 episodes, the 10th being the season finale. On May 17, 2017, Slice confirmed via Twitter, that the show would not have a reunion special.

On June 8, 2017, Corus Entertainment programming chief Barbara Williams confirmed that the series would not return for a second season. She stated the network "may try a different Canadian city" in the future.

Overview and casting

In June 2016, it was announced that Canada would be receiving a second installment centred in Toronto. The show is the first spin-off of The Real Housewives of Vancouver. The Real Housewives of Toronto aired on Slice in spring 2017, with the first season consisting of 10 episodes. The show follows six housewives and gives an “intimate look at the luxurious lives of the city’s wealthiest women, from their extravagant day-to-day escapades in Toronto to grandiose getaways to their exclusive colossal cottages in Muskoka – Ontario's playground for the rich and famous.” It had been reported that filming for the first season began on July 18, 2016. On July 19, 2016, the following day of when filming had allegedly begun, actress Ariane Bellamar made claims that she had been cast as a housewife but was let go. Bellamar alleges the termination is due to a date clash of her Caesarean section with an “all-cast retreat.” She says she intends to pursue legal action. On February 9, 2017, it was announced that the cast of the 10 part series would consist of Kara Alloway, Roxy Earle, Gregoriane "Grego" Minot, Ann Kaplan Mulholland, Joan Kelley Walker and Jana Webb. Slice promoted the show prior to its premiere, through various forms of social media and throughout Toronto. The show premiered on March 7, 2017, with its final episode of season 1 airing on May 9, 2017.

Broadcast 
The Real Housewives of Toronto premiered on Slice on March 7, 2017, at 10 PM Eastern Time.

Episodes

References

2010s Canadian reality television series
2017 Canadian television series debuts
2017 Canadian television series endings
Television shows filmed in Toronto
Television shows set in Toronto
Toronto
Slice (TV channel) original programming
Television series by Corus Entertainment
Canadian television series based on American television series
Women in Ontario